Itaporanga may refer to the following places in Brazil:

Itaporanga, Paraíba
Itaporanga, São Paulo
Itaporanga d'Ajuda, Sergipe

See also
Itapiranga (disambiguation)